The Osseriates (also Oseriates) were an Illyrian tribe in Pannonia. The Osseriates along with the Celtic Varciani and the Colapiani were created from the Breuci.

See also 
List of ancient tribes in Illyria

References 

Illyrian tribes
Pannonians